Billy Hughes (1862–1952) was the 7th Prime Minister of Australia.

Billy Hughes may also refer to:
 Billy Hughes (actor) (1948–2005), American actor
 Billy Hughes (educationist) (1914–1995), British Labour Party politician and educationist
 Billy Hughes (footballer, born 1865) (1865–1919), Welsh international
 Billy Hughes (footballer, born 1918) (1918–1981), Birmingham, Chelsea and Wales international footballer
 Billy Hughes (footballer, born 1920) (1920–1995), Welsh footballer with Hartlepool United
 Billy Hughes (footballer, born March 1929) (1929–2003), Scottish footballer with York City
 Billy Hughes (footballer, born May 1929) (1929–2005), Northern Irish international footballer
 Billy Hughes (footballer, born 1948) (1948–2019), Scottish footballer with Sunderland
 Billy Hughes (footballer, born 1960), English footballer with Gillingham
 Billy Hughes (musician) (1908–1995), Western Swing musician and songwriter
 Billy Hughes (Canadian football) (1888–1955), Canadian football and ice hockey coach and player

See also
Billie Hughes (1948–1998), American singer and songwriter
William Hughes (disambiguation)
Hughes (surname)